Ohsweken Demons were a Canadian professional indoor lacrosse team that played in the Canadian Lacrosse League. The Demons played out of the Iroquois Lacrosse Arena in Hagersville, Ontario.

History
The Ohsweken Demons played their first game ever on January 7, 2012, at home, in Hagersville, Ontario. The Demons defeated the Oshawa Machine 19-13.

Ohsweken finished the 2012 regular season with an 8-6 record, placing them 3rd in the CLax standings. In the first round of playoff action the Demons would face the second-seeded Brampton Inferno, who also finished the season with an 8-6 record. Chris Attwood would score the decisive goal to give Ohsweken the 17-16 victory. In the Creators' Cup championship, the Demons would face the Iroquois Ironmen in an all native match-up. Ohsweken would become the first-ever Creators' Cup Champions winning 15-10.

Many Demons players were commemorated for their efforts on the 2012 All-CLax team as well as by receiving awards in the first-ever season of the Canadian Lacrosse League. Goalie Jeff Powless was named to the All-CLax First Team and CLax Goaltender of the Year. Chris Attwood was selected to the first team, as well as being named the Offensive Player of the Year and league MVP. Clay Hill, a former member of the Buffalo Bandits of the National Lacrosse League, was named to the All-CLax Second Team.

Season-by-season record
Note: GP = Games played, W = Wins, L = Losses, T = Ties, OTL = Overtime losses, Pts = Points, GF = Goals for, GA = Goals against

References

External links
 Ohsweken Demons website
 Ohsweken Demons on Twitter

Canadian Lacrosse League
Lacrosse teams in Ontario
Lacrosse clubs established in 2011
2011 establishments in Ontario
Sports clubs disestablished in 2016
2016 disestablishments in Ontario
Haldimand County